The 2019 Men's World Junior Squash Championships was the men's edition of the 2019 World Junior Squash Championships, which serves as the individual world Junior championship for squash players. The event took place in Kuala Lumpur in Malaysia from 30 July to 4 August 2019.

Mostafa Asal of Egypt is the defending champion of this competition after defeating compatriot Marwan Tarek in the final of the 2018 edition.

Seeds
The seeds was published on 12 July 2019.

Draw and results

Finals

Top half

Section 1

Section 2

Section 3

Section 4

Bottom half

Section 5

Section 6

Section 7

Section 8

See also
2019 Women's World Junior Squash Championships
World Junior Squash Championships

References

External links
Men's World Junior Championships 2019 official website

World Junior Squash Championships
2019 in squash
2019 in Malaysian sport
Squash tournaments in Malaysia
International sports competitions hosted by Malaysia
July 2019 sports events in Malaysia
August 2019 sports events in Malaysia